John Hugh Niland (born February 29, 1944) is a former American football offensive guard in the National Football League (NFL) for the Dallas Cowboys and Philadelphia Eagles. He was a six-time Pro Bowler and a three-time All-Pro. He played college football at the University of Iowa.

In 2021, the Professional Football Researchers Association named Niland to the PFRA Hall of Very Good Class of 2021

Early years
Niland was raised by his adopted family and attended Amityville Memorial High School, where he was an All-State fullback.

He accepted a football scholarship from the University of Iowa, where he started out as a fullback, before being converted into an offensive tackle and becoming a starter at right tackle as a sophomore. He was moved to offensive guard as a junior.

Niland was an All-American selection his senior year in (1965) and also a second-team All-America selection in 1964 by the Newspaper Enterprise Association.

In 1989, he was named to the Iowa All-time Football Team. In 2006, he was inducted into the University of Iowa Athletics Hall of Fame.

Niland was inducted into the Suffolk Sports Hall of Fame on Long Island in the Football Category with the Class of 1997.

Professional career

Dallas Cowboys
Niland was selected in the first round (fifth overall) of the 1966 NFL Draft by the Dallas Cowboys, becoming the first offensive lineman in franchise history to be drafted in the first round. He was also selected by the Oakland Raiders in the thirteenth round (116th overall) of the 1966 AFL Draft.

As a rookie, Niland started four games at offensive tackle in place of an injured Jim Boeke. In 1967, his emergence as the starting left guard, allowed the team to move Tony Liscio  to left tackle.

Niland was the starter at left guard from 1966 to 1974. One of the top offensive linemen of his era, he excelled as a pulling guard.

Practicing against Bob Lilly, beginning in his rookie year, helped Niland become a Pro Bowler and solidified an offensive line that won two NFC Championship Games and one Super Bowl. He was nicknamed Johnny Nightlife by his teammates, because of his thirst for the nightlife.

As a rookie, Niland started in the 1966 NFL Championship Game and later in the 1967 NFL Championship Game, famously known as the "Ice Bowl", both Cowboy losses, playing next to left tackle Tony Liscio and opposite right defensive tackle Lionel Aldridge of the Green Bay Packers.

The Cowboys eventually won the NFC Championship Game during the 1970-71 NFL playoffs against the San Francisco 49ers, due in large part to Duane Thomas's 143 yards on the ground, but lost in Super Bowl V to the Baltimore Colts. However, in the following year, they defeated again the San Francisco 49ers in the NFC Championship Game of the 1971-72 NFL playoffs and then the Miami Dolphins in Super Bowl VI. In the latter game, Niland and Liscio overwhelmed Bob Heinz and Bill Stanfill, respectively, leading Duane Thomas and others to a whopping 252 yards on the ground.

Along with Rayfield Wright, Nate Newton, Larry Allen, Tyron Smith and Zack Martin, Niland is one of only six offensive lineman in team history with at least six Pro Bowl selections. He was selected to six consecutive Pro Bowls from 1968 to 1973 and was a three-time All-Pro selection, while only missing two games in his nine seasons with the Cowboys.

On September 14, 1975, he was traded to the Philadelphia Eagles in exchange for a third round draft choice (#62-Tony Hill).

Philadelphia Eagles
In 1975, he started 13 games at left guard after missing the season opener with a hamstring injury. The next year, he tore ligaments in his left knee during a training camp practice and was placed on the injured reserve list.

Personal life
Niland served military duty at Fort Hood.

References

External links
John Niland's Official Website (archive)

1944 births
Living people
Sportspeople from Quincy, Massachusetts
Players of American football from Massachusetts
American football offensive guards
Iowa Hawkeyes football players
Dallas Cowboys players
Philadelphia Eagles players
Eastern Conference Pro Bowl players
National Conference Pro Bowl players